Cumignano sul Naviglio is a comune (municipality) in the Province of Cremona in the Italian region Lombardy, located about  east of Milan and about  northwest of Cremona.

Cumignano sul Naviglio borders the following municipalities: Genivolta, Salvirola, Soncino, Soresina, Ticengo, Trigolo.

References

Cities and towns in Lombardy